Marc Carbó Bellapart (born 21 May 1994) is a Spanish footballer who plays as a midfielder for CD Lugo.

Club career
Born in Salt, Girona, Catalonia, Carbó finished his formation with AEC Manlleu. He made his senior debut on 19 May 2013, coming on as a late substitute in a 0–3 Tercera División away loss against CF Montañesa.

After being released by the club, Carbó subsequently represented AE Cornellà del Terri and CE Farners in the lower leagues. In July 2015 he joined Girona FC, a club he already represented as a youth, being initially assigned to the reserve team.

On 18 July 2016, Carbó moved to CF Peralada as the club became Girona's new reserve side. On 30 October he made his professional debut with the Blanquivermells' first team, replacing goalscorer Portu in a 3–0 home win against CD Numancia in the Segunda División.

On 14 July 2017, Carbó agreed to a deal with Segunda División B side UE Llagostera. After suffering relegation, he moved to fellow league team CF Badalona, and was a regular starter during his two-year spell.

On 30 July 2020, Carbó signed for Mérida AD also in the third tier. Roughly one year later, he joined San Fernando CD in the new Primera División RFEF.

On 5 July 2022, Carbó signed a two-year deal with second division side CD Lugo.

Personal life
Carbó's uncle Manuel was also a footballer. A defender, he mainly represented CE Sabadell FC in the second tier.

References

External links

1994 births
Living people
People from Gironès
Sportspeople from the Province of Girona
Spanish footballers
Footballers from Catalonia
Association football midfielders
Segunda División players
Primera Federación players
Segunda División B players
Tercera División players
AEC Manlleu footballers
Girona FC B players
CF Peralada players
Girona FC players
UE Costa Brava players
CF Badalona players
Mérida AD players
San Fernando CD players
CD Lugo players